The EuroHockey Club Champions Cup is a defunct men's field hockey competition for clubs in Europe. It was first played for in 1974. It was replaced by the Euro Hockey League in 2007. Unofficial tournaments were played in 1969 and then in 1970, in 1971, in 1972 and in 1973).

Summaries

Medal tables

See also
EuroHockey Club Champions Cup (women)
Euro Hockey League
Men's EuroHockey Indoor Club Cup

Notes

External links
EuroHockey Club Champions Cup Women's
EuroHockey Outdoor Regulations

 
International club field hockey competitions in Europe
Recurring sporting events established in 1974
1974 establishments in Europe
Recurring sporting events disestablished in 2007
2007 disestablishments in Europe